Baeoalitriozus is a genus of true bugs belonging to the family Triozidae. The species of this genus are found in Northern America, Africa and Southeastern Asia.

Species
Species:

 Baeoalitriozus afrobsoletus (Hollis, 1984)
 Baeoalitriozus afrosersalisia (Hollis, 1984)
 Baeoalitriozus asiaticus (Crawford, 1915)
 Baeoalitriozus boxi (Hollis, 1984)
 Baeoalitriozus bryani (Crawford, 1928)
 Baeoalitriozus catillus (Tuthill, 1964)
 Baeoalitriozus concavus (Tuthill, 1943)
 Baeoalitriozus diospyri (Ashmead, 1881)
 Baeoalitriozus fulgidiceps (Tuthill, 1964)
 Baeoalitriozus gonjae (Hollis, 1984)
 Baeoalitriozus magnicauda (Crawford, 1919)
 Baeoalitriozus mimusops (Hollis, 1984)
 Baeoalitriozus obsoletus (Buckton, 1900)
 Baeoalitriozus praelongus (Tuthill, 1964)
 Baeoalitriozus swezeyi (Crawford, 1927)
 Baeoalitriozus yangi Li, 2011

References

Triozidae